Giovanni Battista Cattaneo Della Volta (Genoa, 23 June 1638 - Genoa, 24 December 1721) was the 131st Doge of the Republic of Genoa and king of Corsica.

Biography 
The mandate of the doge Cattaneo Della Volta, the eighty-sixth in biennial succession and the one hundred and thirty-first in republican history, was characterized by the ordinary administration of the state. Among its most important measures was the authorization granted to the community of Nervi for the construction of the new marina. After the dogate ended on 5 September 1693, he left the biennial residence of Doge's Palace for his palace in the historic center of Genoa. In 1713 he retired to private life and died on 24 December 1721 in Genoa.

See also 

 Republic of Genoa
 Doge of Genoa

References 

17th-century Doges of Genoa
1638 births
1721 deaths